WorldWideScience.org is a global science search engine (Academic databases and search engines) designed to accelerate scientific discovery and progress by accelerating the sharing of scientific knowledge.  Through a multilateral partnership, WorldWideScience.org enables anyone with internet access to launch a single-query search of national scientific databases and portals in more than 70 countries, covering all of the world's inhabited continents and over three-quarters of the world's population.  From a user's perspective, WorldWideScience.org makes the databases act as if they were a unified whole.

WorldWideScience.org implements federated searching to provide its coverage of global science and research results.  Federated searching technology allows the information patron to search multiple data sources with a single query in real time.  It provides simultaneous access to "deep web" scientific databases, which are typically not searchable by commercial search engines. 

In June 2010, WorldWideScience.org implemented multilingual translations capabilities.  Using Microsoft's Bing Translator, Multilingual WorldWideScience.org offers the user the ability to search across databases in ten languages and then have the results translated into their preferred language.  "One to many" and "many to one" machine translations can be performed for Arabic, Chinese, English, French, German, Japanese, Korean, Portuguese, Russian, and Spanish.

Features and abilities
WorldWideScience.org provides science search through a variety of features and abilities, including:

 Clustering of results by subtopics or dates to help users target their search
 Wikipedia results related to user search terms
 Eureka Science News results related to user search terms
 Mark and send option for emailing results to friends and colleagues
 Enhanced information related to the user's real-time search
 Alerts service
 Multilingual Translations

History
The concept of a global gateway to national science information sources was first described by Dr. Walter Warnick at the International Council for Scientific and Technical Information (ICSTI) annual meeting in Washington, DC, in 2006.  The concept was formalized in January 2007 when the British Library and the United States Department of Energy signed a Statement of Intent to partner in the development of a global science gateway.  Later officially named "WorldWideScience.org", the gateway was developed by the U.S. Department of Energy's Office of Scientific and Technical Information.  The system was unveiled to ICSTI members and the public at the June 2007 ICSTI meeting in Nancy, France.

Since its release in June 2007, WorldWideScience.org has enjoyed tremendous growth in both the number of data sources searched, along with the number of countries participating as information providers.  The default search of WorldWideScience.org includes a search of the US contribution, Science.gov, which tends to return scholarly information as opposed to lay information.  A transition from bilateral management to a multilateral governance structure, called the WorldWideScience Alliance, occurred in 2008.  A formal launch of the Alliance took place at the June 2008 ICSTI meeting in Seoul, Korea.  In June 2010, the multilingual translations feature was launched at the ICSTI meeting in Helsinki, Finland.  Multimedia searching capabilities were added in 2011, allowing the user to search speech-indexed scientific multimedia made available through the ScienceCinema site.  A mobile version of WorldWideScience.org was also released in 2011.

Membership
The WorldWideScience Alliance has an international membership, including CISTI (Canada), ISTIC (China), VTT (Finland), INIST (France), INASP, International Nuclear Information System (INIS),
TIB (Germany), JST (Japan), KISTI (Korea), Health Service Executive (HSE) (Ireland), SciELO (Argentina, Brazil, Chile, Colombia, Cuba, Mexico, Portugal, Spain, Venezuela), CSIR (South Africa), British Library, Science.gov (United States), African Journals OnLine, and ICSTI.

References
 Microsoft Research and WorldWideScience.org Collaborate to Remove Language Barriers, June 11, 2010
 Multilingual WorldWideScience: Accelerating Scientific Research, Empowering Researchers, July 6, 2010
 Breaking Down the Language Barriers, June 30, 2010
 Dr. Wu Yishan's Blog, Engineer in Chief, ISTIC, 推荐一个跨语言、跨库科技文献检索平台, June 15, 2010
 Conduct a global literature search in seconds!, June 14, 2010
 Global science portal using federated search, Trudy Walsh, Government Computer News, June 29, 2007
 DOE builds portal to global science data, Trudy Walsh, Government Computer News, June 22, 2007
 DOE expands global science portal, Joab Jackson, Government Computer News, June 12, 2008
 U.S. OKs global science online gateway, UPI.com, June 12, 2008
 National Research Council of Canada/From Handshake to Multilateral Alliance: WorldWideScience.org, Reuters, July 4, 2008
 Online Databases: Science Info Without Borders, Carol Tenopir, Library Journal, October 1, 2008
 China Joins WorldWideScience.org, SLA Government Information Division, October 31, 2008
 Video of WorldWideScience Alliance Signing Ceremony
 Eureka Science News

External links
 WorldWideScience.org
 International Council for Scientific and Technical Information
 U.S. Department of Energy's Office of Scientific and Technical Information
 British Library
 Statement of Intent
 Participants List
 Academic World Wide Science features by Oscar Bernal
Domain-specific search engines